The 2019 Booker Prize for Fiction was announced on 14 October 2019. The Booker longlist of 13 books was announced on 23 July, and was narrowed down to a shortlist of six on 3 September. The Prize was awarded jointly to Margaret Atwood for The Testaments and Bernardine Evaristo for Girl, Woman, Other. This was the first time the prize was shared since 1992, despite a rule change banning joint winners.

Judging panel
Peter Florence (chair)
Liz Calder
Xiaolu Guo
Afua Hirsch
Joanna MacGregor

Nominees

Shortlist

Longlist

See also
List of winners and shortlisted authors of the Booker Prize for Fiction

References

Man Booker
Booker Prizes by year
2019 awards in the United Kingdom